This is a list of weapons used by the Montenegrin Ground Army.

References

Montenegrin Ground Army
Military equipment of Montenegro
Montenegro-related lists